Chipping is a civil parish in Ribble Valley, Lancashire, England. It contains 43 buildings that are recorded in the National Heritage List for England as designated listed buildings.  Apart from the village of Chipping, the parish is rural.  Within the village, the listed buildings include three churches and associated structures, three public houses, a former school, former almshouses, and a former cotton mill.  Elsewhere the listed buildings are domestic or related to farming, plus a former milestone.

Key

Buildings

References

Citations

Sources

Lists of listed buildings in Lancashire
Buildings and structures in Ribble Valley